Majbritt Hjortshøj (born 25 May 1976) is a Danish sports shooter. She competed in the women's 10 metre air pistol event at the 1996 Summer Olympics.

References

1976 births
Living people
Danish female sport shooters
Olympic shooters of Denmark
Shooters at the 1996 Summer Olympics
Sportspeople from Aalborg